Lophocalotes achlios, also known commonly as the white-throated crested dragon, is a species of lizard in the family Agamidae. The species is endemic to Sumatra, Indonesia

Habitat
The preferred natural habitat of L. achlios is misty cloud forest, above  altitude.

Behavior
L. achlios is arboreal and slow-moving.

Diet
L. achlios is a generalist predator.

Reproduction
L. achlios is oviparous. Clutch size is 2–6 eggs.

References

Lophocalotes
Reptiles of Indonesia
Reptiles described in 2018